Charley Brewer may refer to:
Charley Brewer (fullback) (1873–1958), Harvard fullback 1892–1895
Charles Brewer (American football), Texas quarterback 1953–1955
Charlie Brewer, American football quarterback

See also
Charles Brewer (disambiguation)